Phil Lo Greco (born July 6, 1984) is a Canadian former professional boxer.

Professional career
On June 18, 2010, Lo Greco knocked out the veteran Slawomir Ziemlewicz to win the WBC International welterweight title. This bout was held at the Ristorante La Faraona in Syracuse, Sicily, Italy.

In December 2014, he signed with boxing adviser Al Haymon. He attended Dante Alighieri high school in Toronto.

Professional boxing record

References

External links

Phil Lo Greco on Facebook

Welterweight boxers
1984 births
Living people
Canadian male boxers
Boxers from Toronto
Canadian people of Italian descent